Alphonsea curtisii is a species of plant in the family Annonaceae. It is endemic to Peninsular Malaysia.

References

curtisii
Endemic flora of Peninsular Malaysia
Least concern biota of Asia
Least concern plants
Taxonomy articles created by Polbot